Davie County Jail  is a historic county jail located at Mocksville, Davie County, North Carolina. It was built in 1839, and is a two-story, three bay, brick building with a gable roof.  It was used as a jail until 1909, then renovated for residential use.

It was added to the National Register of Historic Places in 1973.

References

Jails in North Carolina
Jails on the National Register of Historic Places in North Carolina
Government buildings completed in 1839
Buildings and structures in Davie County, North Carolina
National Register of Historic Places in Davie County, North Carolina